Mariano Luis de Urquijo y Muga (1769 in Bilbao, Spain – 1817 in Paris, France) was Secretary of State (Prime Minister) of Spain from 12 February 1799 to 13 December 1800, during the reign of King Carlos IV of Spain, and between 7 July 1808 and 27 June 1813 under the King Joseph Bonaparte.

Biography
Born to a noble Basque family, he studied law in Madrid and Salamanca. He spent some time living in Ireland before entering the Spanish foreign service under the protection of the Count of Aranda and the Count of Floridablanca. It was in 1792, under the Aranda ministry, that he was named High Officer of the Secretary of State (Secretary of the Cabinet). Of progressive ideas, he translated the Death of Caesar of Voltaire, then forbidden by the Catholic Church. Due to it, he was prosecuted by the Holy Office.

Despite his French sympathies, he was appointed First Secretary of State (Prime Minister) 12 February 1799, and remained in office till 13 December 1800. While in office, he did all he could to limit the power and influence of the Inquisition, which brought upon him the enmity of the Holy See. Taking advantage of the Napoleonic invasion of the Papal States, he attempted what came to be known as "Urquijo's Schism" (1799), in which he tried to recover for the Spanish church powers that had previously been assumed by the Pope, including matrimonial dispensations.

Even though he was supported by some jansenist-leaning clerics such as the bishop of Salamanca, Antonio Tavira, his religious policies caused his fall. Godoy, the queen's favourite, had resented Urquijo as a rising star whose influence in court had started to eclipse his own. Palling along with Eusebio Bardají y Azara, an influential rising star in his own right, and Napoleon himself, who feared Urquijo's policies opposing a French intervention in Portugal, they forced Urquijo's dismissal from office.

His brief term also saw several scientific enterprises being initiated: he was, for instance, Alexander von Humboldt's sponsor for his American expedition. He was instrumental in sending Valentin de Foronda as General Consul of Spain in Philadelphia, (1801–1807), and as Spanish Plenipotentiary Minister in the USA 'til the nomination by the "Junta" of Luis de Onis in 1809.

Resenting the conservative and ultra-catholic policies of the Spanish court, he embraced the pro-French government of José I Bonaparte once Napoleon invaded Spain and replaced the Bourbon dynasty with his own brother Joseph (José). After publicly acknowledging José I as lawful King of Spain, Urquijo was called back to court and became Prime Minister again. He remained in office during all of the reign of José I, from 7 July 1808 to 27 June 1813. However, the failed Napoleonic invasion resulted in Spain being in a state of war, and he was unable to carry out any policy apart from helping the French forces of José I, brother of Napoleon, undertake an ineffective war against the Spanish people.

Upon the French defeat, Urquijo fled, along with Joseph I, across the Pyrenees to France into exile, embracing the French nationality. Outlawed in Spain, he died in exile in Paris, in 1817.

References 

1769 births
1817 deaths
Government of Spain
Politics of Spain
Afrancesados
People from Bilbao
Burials at Père Lachaise Cemetery
University of Salamanca alumni